Air Vice Marshal Peter Anthony Latham,  (18 June 1925 – 4 December 2016) was a senior Royal Air Force officer. From 1977 to 1981, he served as Air Officer Commanding No. 11 Group. Earlier in his career, from 1958 to 1960, he was leader of the Black Arrows (predecessor of the current RAF aerobatic team, the Red Arrows). In 1999, he was made an Honorary President of the Royal International Air Tattoo.

Honours
In the 1954 New Year Honours, Latham was awarded the Queen's Commendation for Valuable Service in the Air. In the 1960 Queen's Birthday Honours, he was awarded the Air Force Cross (AFC). In the 1961 Queen's Birthday Honours, he was awarded the Queen's Commendation for Valuable Service for a second time. In the 1980 New Year Honours, he was appointed a Companion of the Order of the Bath (CB).

References

1925 births
2016 deaths
Royal Air Force air marshals
Aerobatic pilots
Companions of the Order of the Bath
Recipients of the Air Force Cross (United Kingdom)
Recipients of the Commendation for Valuable Service in the Air